Ankusam is 1989 Indian Telugu-language action film directed by Kodi Ramakrishna and produced by Shyam Prasad Reddy. The film stars Dr. Rajashekar and his wife Jeevitha, while Rami Reddy and M. S. Reddy play supporting roles. The film is about an honest cop who fights against his enemies and saves the life of his mentor, who is the chief minister by sacrificing his life. The film became a blockbuster at the box office and provided a major breakthrough in the career of Rajasekhar. Ravi Raja Pinisetty directed the Hindi and Kannada remakes - Pratibandh and Abhimanyu with Chiranjeevi and V. Ravichandran respectively in 1990. The film won three Nandi Awards.

Cast
Rajasekhar
Jeevitha
Rami Reddy
M. S. Reddy
Babu Mohan
Prasadbabu

Legacy
The film became successful at box office and provided a major breakthrough in the career of Rajasekhar. Rajasekhar's portrayal of honest and short-tempered police officer received critical acclaim and he went on to be typecast in similar roles throughout his career. Both director and actor again teamed up for Nayakudu, which failed to repeat the success of Ankusam. Ramireddy also became famous as a villain and did similar characters in other films.

Srinu Vaitla said that: "Two films – RGV's Shiva and Kodi's Ankusam – deeply influenced me and directly or indirectly prompted me to become a director".

Release
The film was dubbed and released in Tamil as Idhuthaanda Police, which also became commercial successful and was also a huge hit.

Awards
Nandi Awards - 1989
 Best Villain - Rami Reddy
 Second Best Story Writer - Shyam Prasad Reddy
 Best Lyricist - M. S. Reddy

Soundtrack

References

Indian action films
Films directed by Kodi Ramakrishna
Films scored by Satyam (composer)
Telugu films remade in other languages
Fictional portrayals of the Andhra Pradesh Police
1990s Telugu-language films